General Hewett, sometimes spelled General Hewart or General Hewitt,  was a three-deck sailing ship launched at Calcutta in 1811. The British East India Company (EIC) purchased her to use her in the China trade. However, unlike most East Indiamen, on her first voyage from England she transported convicts from England to Australia. Thereafter, she performed five voyages for the EIC. The EIC sold her in 1830 and she then became a general merchantman. In 1864 she was sold for a hulk or to be broken up.

Career
General Hewett was admitted to the Registry of Great Britain on 14 November 1813. She first appears in the Register of Shipping in 1814 with M'Tagart as both master and owner. By then her owner had sold her to the EIC. At the time the EIC purchased General Hewitt, the company had only three vessels of its own. It chartered all the rest, including the ones built expressly for the EIC's trade.

Convict transport (1813–14)
Under the command of Captain Percy Earl, General Hewitt sailed from England on 26 August 1813, with 300 male convicts, 104 crew, 70 soldiers, 15 women and five children. The soldiers came from the 46th Regiment of Foot and guarded the convicts.

General Hewett arrived at Port Jackson on 7 February 1814, having travelled via Madeira and Rio de Janeiro.

The voyage took 165 days, during which 34 male convicts died, a large number, mostly of contagious dysentery. The losses on General Hewitt, and Three Bees led in 1814 to Surgeon William Redfern preparing a report for Governor Lachlan Macquarie on the sanitary problems of the ships transporting convicts to New South Wales. This report led to a great improvement in conditions, including the appointment of a medical officer for each voyage.

General Hewett left Port Jackson on 6 April bound for Ceylon. She carried the main contingent of the 73rd Regiment of Foot (10 officers, including the commanding officer, Lt. Col. Maurice O'Connell, 362 rank and file, 96 women, and 163 children), which the 46th Regiment was replacing. They arrived in Colombo on 18 August 1814.

EIC
General Hewett made five trips to China or India for the EIC between 1816 and 1825.

Voyage #1 (1816-17)
The group reached Madeira on 19 February. Lyra and General Hewitt went on to Simon's Bay on 13 April, Batavia on 12 June, Hong Kong bay on 10 July, and Whampoa on 22 October. Alceste sailed to Rio de Janeiro and met up with the other two vessels on 9 June at the Anjere roads.

After Lord Amherst had landed at Taku to proceed to Peking, Alceste and General Hewett had gone to Canton. There the authorities refused permission for Alceste to ascend the river and ordered the local merchants to deny General Hewitt any cargo. Alceste fired several broadsides at the fort and junks that attempted to block her way, and proceeded to anchor at the usual place. Shortly thereafter Alceste received fresh provisions, and General Hewett a cargo. The firing that had taken place at the mouth of the river was officially described as a "friendly interchange of salutes".

On her return voyage General Hewett crossed the Second Bar on 4 December and reached St Helena on 12 March 1817. She arrived at the Downs on 12 May. Part of the presents for the Emperor of China, which Lord Amherst had not been able to deliver due to a disagreement between the British and the Court over protocol, had been sold in Canton and General Hewett was returning with the rest.

Voyage #2 (1818-19)
Captain Peter Cameron left the Downs on 28 May 1818, bound for Bengal and Madras. On 14 September General Hewett arrived at the New Anchorage, Calcutta. As she made her way back down the coast, she reached Coninga on 30 December, and then Madras on 9 January 1819. Homeward bound, she reached Colombo on 28 February, Port Louis on 13 April, and St Helena on 30 June. She arrived at Long Reach on September.

Voyage #3 (1820-21)
Captain James Pearson left the Downs on 15 April 1820 for China.  On 7 August, while navigating Clement's Strait, the eastern branch of Gaspar Strait between Banca and Billiton islands, General Hewett struck a rock and was aground for about 15 minutes. The rock came to be known as General Hewitt's Rock.

General Hewett arrived at Whampoa on 28 August. On the return leg of her voyage she crossed the Second Bar on 5 November, reaching the Cape on 28 February 1821 and St Helena on 31 March. She arrived at Long Reach on 30 May.

This return voyage was not without incident as His Majesty's Customs at Cape Town seized her cargo and that of Marchioness of Ely on account of defective manifests. This case also involved an issue of jurisdiction between the Vice admiralty court and the Court of Justice. The EIC's agent at Cape Town had to post bond in order for the vessels to continue on their journeys.

Voyage #4 (1822-23)
Captain Pearson left the Downs again on 19 June 1822 for Bengal. On this voyage she carried part of the 16th Lancers, which regiment was transferring to India. General Hewett reached the Cape on 1 October and arrived at the New Anchorage on 23 December. She was back at the Cape on 4 May 1823, and St Helena 16 days later. She arrived at Blackwall, on the Thames on 26 July.

Voyage #5 (1824-25)
Captain Thomas William Barrow, who had served aboard General Hewett as first officer on her previous voyage, left the Downs on 23 June 1824 for Bengal. [General Hewett  arrived at the New Anchorage on 30 October. She left Bengal on 8 March 1825 and reached St Helena on 24 May. General Hewitt, Barrow, commander, was reported to be off Weymouth on 18 July. She arrived at Long Reach on 20 July.

The EIC sold General Hewett to William Tindall on 22 September 1830 for £6250.

Merchantman
As a merchantman, General Hewett made numerous voyages to Australia carrying immigrants.

General Hewett received a new deck, wales, and major repairs in 1842. She left London on 20 October 1845, under the command of Captain Hart. On this voyage she carried passengers and cargo and arrived at Port Jackson on 21 January 1846.

Departing Plymouth on 11 August 1848, under the command of John Gatenby, she carried passengers and cargo and arrived at Port Jackson on 13 November 1848. She left afterwards for India.

Leaving London on 24 August 1852, under the command of John Gatenby, she carried passengers and cargo and arrived at Port Jackson on 24 December 1852.

In 1854 William Tindall sold General Hewitt to J. Michael, of London, for £6,250.  General Hewett was sheathed in felt and copper fastened with iron bolts in 1854.

On 3 April 1756 Michael sold General Hewitt to J. Wilson, of London, for £4,550.

General Hewett, under the command of Christopher Loudt, master, left Plymouth for on 5 July 1856 and arrived at Portland, Victoria, on 9 October. She carried 366 immigrants.

These amounted to 320½ statute adults, with the fare per statute adult being £13 4s 6d. On the voyage about four or five children were born, and the number of deaths was about the same. Agricultural laborers (105) and female domestics (60) accounted for about half of the immigrants. Married couples numbered 74, and single men numbered 82. There was labour strife on board with crewmen jumping ship when she arrived, others refusing to work on the voyage, and two assaulting Loudt.

Fate
In 1864 General Hewitt was sold for a hulk or to be broken up.

Notes, citations, and references

Notes

Citations

References
Asiatic Journal and Monthly Register for British and Foreign India, China, and Australia, Vol. 5 (1818), (Parbury, Allen, and Company). 
 
 
 
Historical Record of the Sixteenth, Or the Queen's Regiment of Light Dragoons, Lancers: Containing an Account of the Formation of the Regiment in 1759, and of Its Subsequent Services to 1841. (John W. Parker).
 
House of Commons, Parliament, Great Britain (1814), Minutes of the Evidence Taken Before the Select Committee on Petitions Relating to East-India-Built Shipping. (H.M. Stationery Office)
  
 

1811 ships
British ships built in India
Convict ships to New South Wales
Ships of the British East India Company
Age of Sail merchant ships
Merchant ships of the United Kingdom